Hector Sohier was a 16th-century Normand architect. He is the author of many buildings in Caen. He died around 1560.

Works 
 Apse of the Church of Saint-Pierre, Caen (1518-1545)
 Château of Chanteloup

Works formerly attributed to Hector Sohier 
 .
 Château de Lasson (circa 1517).

References

External links 
 Hector Sohier on Encyclopédie Universalis 

16th-century French architects
Year of birth missing
1560s deaths